John Benjamin Long (September 8, 1843 – April 27, 1924) was a newspaper publisher, college president and a member of the United States House of Representatives from Texas.

Born in Douglass, Texas, Long moved with his parents to Rusk, Texas, in 1846. He was educated in private schools, and, although he studied law and was admitted to state bar, he never practiced law. Instead, he took over the family cotton business in Rusk.

He enlisted in the Confederate States Army at the age of seventeen and served throughout the war in Company C, Third Texas Cavalry. This cavalry unit became part of the "Ross Brigade" under the command of Brig. General Lawrence Sullivan "Sul" Ross who was later Governor of Texas. Following the end of the war, he returned to Rusk, TX and married Emma Wiggins.

In 1886 Long purchased the Standard Herald newspaper in Rusk and served as editor until 1905. As the candidate of Democratic Party, he was elected in 1890 to the Fifty-second Congress of the United States, serving from March 4, 1891 – March 3, 1893. He was an unsuccessful candidate for re-nomination in 1892. In 1895, he became president of The Agricultural and Mechanical College of Texas, later Texas A&M University. He served as a member of the Texas House of Representatives from Cherokee County (Rusk) in the session of 1913-1914.

He died in Rusk, TX on April 27, 1924, and was buried in Cedar Hill Cemetery in Rusk.

Sources

Texas State Archives.

1843 births
1924 deaths
American planters
Confederate States Army personnel
Democratic Party members of the United States House of Representatives from Texas
People from Nacogdoches County, Texas
People from Rusk, Texas